Ekaette is a surname. Notable people with the surname include:

Angela Ekaette, Nigerian ballet dancer
Ufot Ekaette (born 1939), Nigerian government official
Eme Ufot Ekaette (born 1945), Nigerian politician

Surnames of Nigerian origin